A. J. Green (born September 27, 1999) is an American basketball player for the Milwaukee Bucks of the National Basketball Association (NBA), on a two-way contract with the Wisconsin Herd of the NBA G League. He played college basketball for the Northern Iowa Panthers.

Early life and high school career
Green attended Holmes Junior High School, where he first decided he wanted to play college basketball. He played for Cedar Falls High School on the basketball team as well as the Iowa Barnstormers in AAU play. As a senior, he averaged 26 points per game and became Cedar Falls' all-time leading scorer. He led the team to a state championship

Recruiting
Green was a consensus four-star recruit and was considered the No. 78 player in the 2018 class by ESPN. On August 11, 2017, he committed to play college basketball for Northern Iowa, where his father was a member of the coaching staff. Green became the highest-rated player to ever commit to Northern Iowa and the program's first four-star recruit. He chose the Panthers over offers from Iowa State, Minnesota and Nebraska, among other major programs.

College career
As a freshman, Green averaged 15 points per game. However, he struggled with turnovers, with 77 assists to 94 turnovers. Green was named Missouri Valley Conference Freshman of the Year, becoming the first Northern Iowa player to receive the honor since Seth Tuttle in 2012, as well as Third Team All-MVC. On January 4, 2020, Green scored a career-high 35 points in a 69–64 win over Bradley. He had 34 points on February 8, in a 83–73 win over Drake. On February 12, Green scored 27 points in a 71–63 win over Illinois State and surpassed the 1,000 point threshold. At the conclusion of the regular season, Green was named MVC Player of the Year. He averaged 19.7 points and 3.0 assists per game as a sophomore. Following the season, Green declared for the 2020 NBA draft. However, on July 30, 2020, he withdrew from the draft and decided to return to Northern Iowa for his junior season. 

On December 13, 2020, Panthers head coach Ben Jacobson announced that Green would undergo hip surgery and miss the remainder of the 2020–21 season. He only appeared in 3 games, averaging 22.3 points, 5.7 rebounds and 2.7 assists per game. The following season, Green returned and averaged 18.8 points, 3.7 rebounds, and 2.5 assists per game, culminating in his second selection as MVC Player of the Year. On April 20, 2022, Green entered the transfer portal while also declaring for the 2022 NBA draft and maintaining his college eligibility. However, on June 1, 2022, he announced he would remain in the draft and forego his remaining eligibility.

Professional career 
After going undrafted in the 2022 NBA draft, Green signed a two-way contract with the Milwaukee Bucks. Green joined the Bucks' 2022 NBA Summer League roster. In his Summer League debut, Green scored fourteen points in a 94–90 win against the Brooklyn Nets.

Career statistics

College

|-
| style="text-align:left;"| 2018–19
| style="text-align:left;"| Northern Iowa
| 34 || 34 || 29.9 || .410 || .348 || .864 || 3.0 || 2.3 || .6 || .1 || 15.0
|-
| style="text-align:left;"| 2019–20
| style="text-align:left;"| Northern Iowa
| 31 || 31 || 34.8 || .416 || .391 || .917 || 3.0 || 3.0 || .7 || .0 || 19.7
|-
| style="text-align:left;"| 2020–21
| style="text-align:left;"| Northern Iowa
| 3 || 3 || 36.3 || .464 || .407 || .667 || 5.7 || 2.7 || 1.3 || .7 || 22.3
|-
| style="text-align:left;"| 2021–22
| style="text-align:left;"| Northern Iowa
| 31 || 31 || 36.4 || .410 || .388 || .915 || 3.7 || 2.5 || .8 || .0 || 18.8
|- class="sortbottom"
| style="text-align:center;" colspan="2"| Career
| 99 || 99 || 33.7 || .414 || .378 || .900 || 3.3 || 2.6 || .7 || .1 || 17.9

Personal life
Green's father, Kyle Green, is an associate head basketball coach for Iowa State. He was previously an assistant coach and later associate head coach for Northern Iowa. Kyle played NCAA Division III basketball for Hamline University before spending one season professionally in Denmark, where he also began his coaching career. Green's mother, Michele, played basketball for Hamline and is a chiropractor. Green's younger sister, Emerson, played basketball for Cedar Falls High School and is now playing at Northern Iowa.

References

External links
Northern Iowa Panthers bio

1999 births
Living people
American men's basketball players
Basketball players from Iowa
Milwaukee Bucks players
Northern Iowa Panthers men's basketball players
People from Cedar Falls, Iowa
Point guards
Shooting guards
Undrafted National Basketball Association players